Roland Widmer (born 26 September 1965) is a retired Swiss football defender.

Honours
Neuchâtel Xamax
Swiss Super Cup: 1988

References

1965 births
Living people
Swiss men's footballers
FC Luzern players
Neuchâtel Xamax FCS players
FC Wettingen players
FC Zürich players
Association football defenders
Swiss Super League players
Switzerland under-21 international footballers
Sportspeople from Lucerne